Blackfield V is the fifth studio album by art rock band Blackfield. Recorded over a year and a half period across 2015 and 2016, the album, initially intended for release on 18 November 2016, was later delayed to 10 February 2017. The album, the fifth between the musical partnership between Steven Wilson and Aviv Geffen, is the third released as an even collaboration between the two; while Blackfield and Blackfield II were even collaborations, Welcome to My DNA and Blackfield IV saw increased writing and musicianship from Geffen while Wilson focused on his solo albums Grace for Drowning and The Raven that Refused to Sing (And Other Stories).

Background and recording 
After the release of Blackfield IV and a brief tour in its support, Steven Wilson, co-founder of the group, who had already played his smallest role in the project yet, announced that he intended to leave the band altogether in 2014 to focus on his solo career. While this originally left the future of the band in question, throughout the 2015 and 2016, the band's social media accounts would release pictures of Wilson, co-founder Aviv Geffen, and music producer Alan Parsons in recording sessions in the studio. In August 2016, it was confirmed that there would be a fifth album, Wilson was still with the project, and he even contributed evenly to the sessions as he had with the band's first two albums, before he had begun to focus more on his solo career while Geffen took over more responsibilities for their second two albums. The album had been recorded on and off over the course of an 18-month period, including sessions in both England and Israel. Wilson and Geffen shared vocals, guitars, and keyboard duties, while long-time drummer Tomer Z returned to play the drum parts. Additionally, the London Sessions Orchestra was recruited for the string arrangements of the album. It was also announced that Parsons had produced three of the key tracks for the album.

Themes and composition
The band describes the album as a loose concept album themed around the ocean and the cycle of life, flowing across thirteen songs and approximately 45 minutes of music.

Release and promotion
The album was originally scheduled for release on 18 November 2016 before being delayed to 10 February 2017. No reason was cited beyond "circumstances beyond the band's control", though the album itself was complete at the time of the delay announcement. On 8 December 2016, "Family Man", "How Was Your Ride?", and "Sorrys", the second, third, and fifth songs from the album, were released.

Track listing

Personnel
Credits are adapted from the album's liner notes.

Blackfield
 Steven Wilson – lead vocals, guitar (2-4, 6, 7, 9-13), bass (4, 6, 7, 9-13), keyboards (1, 12, 13), drum programming (12), backing vocals (4, 5, 11, 12)
 Aviv Geffen – lead vocals, guitar (9, 12), bass (12), keyboards (2-12), piano (5, 12), Mellotron (6, 9), string arrangements (1, 3, 4, 7, 8, 10, 11), backing vocals (2, 3, 6, 7, 13)
 Tomer Z – drums (2-4, 6, 7, 9-11, 13), percussion (2, 3, 6)
 Eran Mitelman – keyboards (4, 9, 11), piano (3, 6, 11), Mellotron (9), Hammond organ (3)

Additional musicians
 Omri Agmon – acoustic guitar (2, 5, 7, 10), additional guitar (9)
 Mike Garson – piano (8)
 Hadar Green – bass (3)
 Alex Moshe – female vocals (7, 12), backing vocals (3, 11)
 Alan Parsons – backing vocals (3)
 The London Session Orchestra – orchestral performance (1, 3, 4, 7, 8, 10, 11)

Production
 Steven Wilson – production (1, 6, 12, 13), engineering, mixing (1, 3, 4, 8, 9, 12, 13)
 Aviv Geffen – production (2, 5, 7, 8, 10-12)
 Alan Parsons – production (3, 4, 9)
 Simon Bloor – engineering, mixing (2, 5-7, 10, 11)
 Graham Archer – engineering
 Ofer Mappa – engineering
 Yonatan Danino – engineering
 Lasse Hoile – cover art, photography
 Carl Glover – design

Charts

References

External links

2017 albums
Blackfield albums
Kscope albums